Teton County is a county located in the U.S. state of Idaho. As of the 2020 census, the population was 11,630. The county seat is Driggs, and the largest city is Victor. The county was established in 1915 and was named after the Teton Mountains to the east.

Teton County is part of the Jackson, WY-ID Micropolitan Statistical Area.

The Teton Valley was discovered by John Colter in 1808, a member of the Lewis and Clark Expedition (1804–06). It became known as Pierre's Hole, and it hosted the well-attended 1832 Rendezvous, which was followed by the Battle of Pierre's Hole.

Geography
It is the second-smallest county in Idaho by area.

Adjacent counties
 Fremont County - north
 Madison County - west
 Bonneville County - south
 Teton County, Wyoming - east

Major highways
 SH-31
 SH-32
 SH-33

National protected area
 Targhee National Forest (part)

Demographics

2000 census
As of the census of 2000, there were 5,999 people, 2,078 households, and 1,464 families living in the county.  The population density was 13 people per square mile (5/km2).  There were 2,632 housing units at an average density of 6 per square mile (2/km2).  The racial makeup of the county was 91.32% White, 0.17% Black or African American, 0.55% Native American, 0.18% Asian, 0.23% Pacific Islander, 6.73% from other races, and 0.82% from two or more races.  11.75% of the population were Hispanic or Latino of any race. 25.5% were of English, 15.8% German, 7.6% American and 5.1% Irish ancestry.

There were 2,078 households, out of which 39.70% had children under the age of 18 living with them, 60.30% were married couples living together, 5.80% had a female householder with no husband present, and 29.50% were non-families. 21.30% of all households were made up of individuals, and 5.30% had someone living alone who was 65 years of age or older.  The average household size was 2.87 and the average family size was 3.43.

In the county, the population was spread out, with 31.80% under the age of 18, 8.10% from 18 to 24, 33.80% from 25 to 44, 18.90% from 45 to 64, and 7.50% who were 65 years of age or older.  The median age was 31 years. For every 100 females, there were 112.70 males.  For every 100 females age 18 and over, there were 114.50 males.

The median income for a household in the county was $41,968, and the median income for a family was $45,848. Males had a median income of $32,309 versus $22,243 for females. The per capita income for the county was $17,778.  About 9.70% of families and 12.90% of the population were below the poverty line, including 18.10% of those under age 18 and 7.90% of those age 65 or over.

2010 census
As of the 2010 United States Census, there were 10,170 people, 3,651 households, and 2,509 families living in the county. The racial makeup of the county was 85.6% white, 0.5% Asian, 0.3% American Indian, 0.2% black or African American, 0.1% Pacific islander, 11.7% from other races, and 1.5% from two or more races. Those of Hispanic or Latino origin made up 16.9% of the population. In terms of ancestry, 29.9% were English, 20.3% were German, 13.0% were Irish, and 4.2% were American.

Of the 3,651 households, 39.3% had children under the age of 18 living with them, 58.9% were married couples living together, 5.9% had a female householder with no husband present, 31.3% were non-families, and 21.9% of all households were made up of individuals. The average household size was 2.78 and the average family size was 3.33. The median age was 33.2 years.

The median income for a household in the county was $53,364 and the median income for a family was $56,791. Males had a median income of $39,865 versus $31,966 for females. The per capita income for the county was $23,633. About 5.4% of families and 7.4% of the population were below the poverty line, including 7.8% of those under age 18 and 2.2% of those age 65 or over.

Government and politics
Similar to other Idaho counties, an elected three-member county commission heads the county government. Other elected officials include clerk, treasurer, sheriff, assessor, coroner, and prosecutor.

Until quite recently Teton County voted Republican along with most other Eastern Idaho counties. However, since 2004, the county has strongly trended towards toss-up status. In 2008, it was one of three Idaho counties to favor Barack Obama, despite giving George W. Bush a 23-point victory only four years earlier. The margin was narrow (39 votes) and Obama lost the county to Mitt Romney in 2012 by over five hundred votes; Donald Trump outpolled Hillary Clinton by just eight votes in 2016, the smallest numerical margin in the country. Teton backed Democrat Joe Biden in the 2020 election, who won by 7.3 percentage points, garnering the highest vote share for any Democrat since 1948.

Teton County is one of only thirteen counties to have voted for Obama in 2008, Romney in 2012, Trump in 2016, and Biden in 2020.

At the state level, Teton County is in District 32 of the Idaho Legislature. As neighboring counties are still strongly Republican, Republicans currently control the district. In Idaho gubernatorial elections, the county has voted for the Democratic nominee in every election since 2006.

Education
The public schools are operated by Teton School District #401, led by the county's only traditional high school, Teton High School, in Driggs.

Communities

Cities
Driggs
Tetonia
Victor

Unincorporated communities
Bates
Felt
Clementsville
Cache
Darby

See also
National Register of Historic Places listings in Teton County, Idaho

Notes

References

External links

Teton Valley Chamber of Commerce
Teton School District #401

 

 
Idaho counties
Jackson, Wyoming micropolitan area
1915 establishments in Idaho
Populated places established in 1915